The following is a timeline of the history of the city of Cartagena, Spain.

Prior to 20th century

 243 BCE -  founded by Carthaginian Hasdrubal the Fair (approximate date).
 209 BCE - Battle of Cartagena (209 BC).
 100-200 CE - Roman Catholic Diocese of Cartagena established.
 425 CE - City sacked by the Goths.
 1243 - Sacked again by Ferdinand III of Castile.
 1276 - James I of Aragon in power.
 1289 - Catholic see relocated from Cartagena to Murcia.
 1585 - Sacked again by an English fleet under Sir Francis Drake.
 1643 - 3 September Battle of Cartagena (1643).
 1691 -  founded.
 1706 - 21 September: Battle of El Albujón in  during the War of the Spanish Succession.
 1758 - 28 February: Battle of Cartagena (1758).
 1762 -  built.
 1779 -  (church) built.
 1782 -  built.
 1786
  begins publication.
  built.
 1810 - Academia de Caballeros Guardias Marinas built.
 1823 - Sociedad Económica de Amigos del País de Cartagena established.
 1842 - Population: 33,593.
 1844 - Scene of warfare again.
 1854 -  (bullring) opens.
 1860 - Population: 54,315.
 1861
 Eco de Cartagena newspaper begins publication.(es)
  active.
 1863 - Railway begins operating.
 1870 - Population: 26,000. (approximate f1gure) 
 1873 - July: Canton of Cartagena declared.
 1874 - (12th Jan) Cartagena was occupied by government troops.
 1887 - El Mediterráneo newspaper begins publication.
 1898 - Cartagena suffered from the maritime disasters of the Spanish-American War.
 1900
  built.
 Population: 99,871.

20th century

 1905 -  founded.
 1907
 16 May: International Pact of Cartagena takes place in city.
 1908 - Post Office built on the Plaza de Valarino Togores.
 1912 -  built.
 1919 - Cartagena Club de Fútbol formed.
 1925 -  (stadium) opens.
 1935 -  newspaper begins publication.
 1939 - March: Cartagena Uprising of nationalists during the Spanish Civil War.
 1940 - UD Cartagenera (football club) formed.
 1943 -  (museum) established.
 1970
  (theatre) opens.
 Population: 146,904.
 1972 -  begins.
 1980 -  begins.
 1981 - Population: 172,751.
 1986 -  (museum) opens.
 1987 -  (television) begins broadcasting.
 1988 - Estadio Cartagonova (stadium) opens.
 1995
  (bus depot) built.
 FC Cartagena (football team) formed.
 1997 -  (museum) opens.
 1998 - Universidad Politécnica de Cartagena established.

21st century

 2005 -  built in the Port of Cartagena.
 2007 -  (museum) built.
 2008 -  (museum) opens.
 2011
  (convention centre) opens.
 Population: 215,757.
 2015 - 24 May:  and Murcian parliamentary election, 2015 held;  elected mayor.

See also
 Cartagena history
 
 
 

Other cities in the autonomous community of the Region of Murcia:(es)
 Timeline of Murcia
 List of municipalities in Murcia province

References

This article incorporates information from the Spanish Wikipedia.

Bibliography

in English

in Spanish
 
 
 
  (2 vols.)
 
 
 
  2002-

External links

  (city archives)
 Items related to Cartagena, various dates (via Europeana)
 Items related to Cartagena, various dates (via Digital Public Library of America)

 
Cartagena